The 2004 Major League Soccer All-Star Game was the 9th Major League Soccer All-Star Game, played on July 31, 2004 at RFK Stadium in Washington, D.C. between the Eastern Conference All-Stars and Western Conference All-Stars. The Eastern Conference earned the victory after a hard-fought 3-2 win over the West.

Overview

The game was originally scheduled to be between the MLS All-Stars against Real Madrid at Gillette Stadium in Foxborough, Massachusetts. Once the Spanish team instead decided to play friendlies in Japan, they opted out of the game in the United States and MLS was forced to change the All-Star Game's format. The MLS All-Stars eventually played Real Madrid at their home stadium Santiago Bernabéu in the 2005 Trofeo Santiago Bernabéu.

Legends game
Prior to the All-Star Game, a celebration of the tenth anniversary of the 1994 FIFA World Cup saw the U.S. Team that played the Cup against played a selection of international MLS veterans in two 25-minute halves. The game finished 2-2, with Raúl Díaz Arce and Mauricio Cienfuegos tying the game in the second-half after the Americans built a lead with Eric Wynalda and Hugo Perez.

U.S. 1994 World Cup Squad
Tony Meola, Mike Burns, Alexi Lalas, Cle Kooiman, Thomas Dooley, John Harkes, Hugo Pérez, Tab Ramos, Eric Wynalda, Frank Klopas Cobi Jones, Juergen Sommer, Mike Sorber, Marcelo Balboa, Paul Caligiuri, Fernando Clavijo.
Coach: Bora Milutinović

MLS International Stars
Jorge Campos, Mike Emenalo, Richard Gough, Martín Vásquez, Frank Yallop, Mauricio Cienfuegos, Marco Etcheverry, Peter Nowak, Mauricio Ramos, Carlos Valderrama, Robert Warzycha, Raúl Díaz Arce, Carlos Hermosillo, Luis Hernández, Mo Johnston, Giovanni Savarese.
Coach: Bruce Arena

Match details

References

External links

2004 MLS All-Star Game Recap

MLS All-Star Game
All-Star Game
MLS All-Star
Sports competitions in Washington, D.C.
July 2004 sports events in the United States
Soccer in Washington, D.C.